James Leslie Carleton  (August 20, 1848 – April 25, 1910) was a Major League Baseball player for the Cleveland Forest Citys from 1871 to 1872.

External links

1848 births
1910 deaths
People from Clinton, Connecticut
New York Mutuals (NABBP) players
Cleveland Forest Citys (NABBP) players
Cleveland Forest Citys players
19th-century baseball players
Baseball players from Connecticut